Sai Tamhankar (Pronunciation: [səiː t̪aːmɦəɳkəɾ]) is an Indian actress known for her work in Marathi, Hindi, Tamil, Malayalam language films and television. She is the recipient of two Filmfare Marathi Awards and one Filmfare Award.

Early life
Tamhankar was born in Sangli, Maharashtra, India, and studied at Savarkar Pratisthan. She was a state level Kabaddi player and has an orange belt in karate as well. She got into acting through a play directed by her mother's friend. Her second play, Aadhe Adhure, won her the Best Actress award, at an inter-college theater competition.

Personal life
Tamhankar got engaged to Amey Gosavi, a visual effects artist on 7 April 2012. They got married on 15 December 2013, but divorced in 2015.

Career

Acting
After her stint in plays, she was offered roles in Marathi television shows and was seen in Ya Gojirvanya Gharat, Agnihotra, Sathi Re and Kasturi. In 2008, Tamhankar made her on-screen debut starring in Subhash Ghai's crime thriller Black & White. She made her Marathi cinema debut through Sanai Chaughade in the same year. Tamhankar also proceeded to work in the Aamir Khan starrer Ghajini .

thumb|180px|
Tamhankar in 2016

In 2015, she was seen in Classmates, directed by Aditya Sarpotdar. Next, she was seen as Jyotsana in Hunterrr. She also essayed Bipasha Basu's character Bobby in the Marathi remake of No Entry, titled No Entry Pudhe Dhokha Aahey. In 2016, she played Kaveri in Vazandar, directed by Sachin Kundalkar, where her performance was appreciated. In the same year, she was also seen in Family Katta. Mihir Bhanage, writing for the Times of India said, "....Kiran Karmarkar as the eldest brother is fantastic and so is Sai Tamhankar, the rebel....".  In 2018, she was seen playing Anjali, a pimp in Love Sonia, for which she had to gain 10 kg of weight. She is seen in the July 2019 movie Girlfriend, opposite Amey Wagh.

Other ventures
She owns Kolhapuri Maavle, a wrestling team in the Zee Maharashtra Kusti Dangal.

Filmography

Films

Television
 Fu Bai Fu  Season 2 – anchor
 Sathi Re
 Kasturi
 Ya Gojirvanya Gharat
 Agni Shikha
 Anubandha
Bigg Boss Marathi 1 (special appearance)
 Maharashtrachi Hasyajatra (Sony Marathi Reality Show) as Judge
 Date with Saie
 Kanala Khada (Zee Marathi Chat Show)
 Bus Bai Bas Ladies Special (Zee Marathi Chat Show)

Web series

 2021 - Samantar 2 (MX Player Original)
 2021 - Navarasa (web series) (Netflix)
 2022 - Pet Puraan (SonyLIV)
 2022 - B.E. Rojgaar (Youtube)

Awards

 Most Natural Performance of the Year 2015 - झी गौरव
 Best Actress Gurupornima 2015 - संस्कृती कला दर्पण
 Most Powerful Women of the Year 2015 - (FEMINA Power List Maharashtra)
 Best Supporting Actress Classmates 2015 - NiFF मराठी
 Best Actress 2015 - Newsmakers Achievers
 Best Supporting Actress – Classmates (Maharashtra Cha Favorite Kon 2015)
 First Marathi Actress to get featured twice on the Cover Page of Femina Magazine in 2015.
 Best Supporting Actress - Family Katta (Jio Filmfare Awards Marathi 2016)
 MFK 2018 - Favorite Popular Face
 MFK 2018 - Favorite Actress
 Maharashtra Achievers Award 2018- Entertainer of the year
 Times Power Woman Award - Young Achiever Award in Marathi Cinema
 Best Actress in a leading role - Dhurala (Filmfare Marathi Awards 2021)
 Best Actress in a supporting role - Mimi International Indian Film Academy Awards
 Best Supporting Actress – Mimi – (67th Filmfare Awards)
 Best Actress – Pondicherry – Pravah Picture Awards

References

External links

 
 

Year of birth missing (living people)
Living people
Marathi actors
People from Sangli
Actresses in Marathi cinema
Actresses in Hindi cinema